The ceremonial county of Cheshire (which includes the areas of the Cheshire West and Chester, Cheshire East, Halton and Warrington unitary authorities) is divided into 11 parliamentary constituencies. The 2 divisions of Warrington are borough constituencies,
with the remaining 9 being county constituencies.

Constituencies

2010 boundary changes
Following the Fifth Periodic Review of Westminster Constituencies by the Boundary Commission for England, the existing 11 constituencies were retained with changes to realign constituency boundaries with the boundaries of current local government wards, and to reduce the electoral disparity between constituencies. These changes were implemented at the 2010 United Kingdom general election.

Proposed boundary changes 
See 2023 Periodic Review of Westminster constituencies for further details.

Following the abandonment of the Sixth Periodic Review (the 2018 review), the Boundary Commission for England formally launched the 2023 Review on 5 January 2021. Initial proposals were published on 8 June 2021 and, following two periods of public consultation, revised proposals were published on 8 November 2022. Final proposals will be published by 1 July 2023.

The commission has proposed that Cheshire be combined with Merseyside as a sub-region of the North West Region, with the creation of two cross-county boundary constituencies of Ellesmere Port and Bromborough, and Widnes and Halewood, which avoids the need for a constituency which spans the River Mersey. As a consequence, there are significant changes in the west of the county. The town of Neston would be moved from Ellesmere Port and Neston to City of Chester, resulting in these constituencies being replaced by Chester North and Neston, and Ellesmere Port and Bromborough respectively. Halton would be abolished, with Widnes being included in the new constituency of Widnes and Halewood, and Runcorn in the new constituency of Runcorn and Helsby. Eddisbury and Weaver Vale would both be abolished, being replaced by Chester South and Eddisbury, and Mid Cheshire.

The following constituencies are proposed:

Containing electoral wards from Cheshire East

 Chester South and Eddisbury (part)

Congleton
Crewe and Nantwich
Macclesfield
Mid Cheshire (part)
Tatton (part)
Containing electoral wards from Cheshire West and Chester
Chester North and Neston
Chester South and Eddisbury (part)
Ellesmere Port and Bromborough (part also in the Merseyside borough of Wirral)
Mid Cheshire (part)
Runcorn and Helsby (part)
Containing electoral wards from Halton
Runcorn and Helsby (part)
Widnes and Halewood (part also in the Merseyside borough of Knowsley)
Containing electoral wards from Warrington
Tatton (part)
Warrington North
Warrington South

Results history
Primary data source: House of Commons research briefing - General election results from 1918 to 2019

2019 
The number of votes cast for each political party who fielded candidates in constituencies comprising Cheshire in the 2019 general election were as follows:

Percentage votes 

11983 & 1987 - SDP-Liberal Alliance

* Included in Other

Seats 

1Martin Bell, MP for Tatton.

Maps

Historical representation by party
A cell marked → (with a different colour background to the preceding cell) indicates that the previous MP continued to sit under a new party name.

1885 to 1918

1918 to 1950

1950 to 1983

1983 to present

See also

 List of parliamentary constituencies in the North West (region)
 List of United Kingdom Parliament constituencies
 History of parliamentary constituencies and boundaries in Cheshire

Notes

References

Cheshire

Parliamentary constituencies